Antoś is a Polish masculine given name that is a diminutive form of Antoni, Antonin and Antonius that is used in Poland. Antoś, Antos or Antoš may either be a surname or given name. As a surname it is derived from the Antonius root name. Notable people with these names include:

Given name
Antoš Frolka (1877 - 1935), Czech painter
Antos Gémes, (born 1981), Hungarian actor

Surname
István Antos (1908 - 1960), Hungarian politician
Mihály Antos (1879 – 1937), Hungarian gymnast.
Václav Antoš (1905 – 1978), Czech swimmer

Fictional characters
Bareil Antos, Star Trek: Deep Space Nine character

See also

Antes (name)
Anto (name)
Anton (given name)
Anton (surname)
Ants (given name) (not a cognate)
Aetos (disambiguation)
Altos (disambiguation)
Antes (disambiguation)
Anthos (disambiguation)
Antis (disambiguation)
Atos (disambiguation)

Notes

Polish masculine given names